On 10 July 2017, a suicide bombing occurred at Bogra Chowk in Chaman, Chaman District, Balochistan, Pakistan. Four people were killed and 20 others were wounded. The deceased were two police officers, the bomber and a passerby. Tehreek-i-Taliban Pakistan claimed responsibility for the attack.

Bombing 
According to police sources, a suicide bomber on a motorcycle rode into District Police Officer of Killa Abdullah, Sajid Khan Mohammad's vehicle killing both of them, his guard and a passerby as well as wounding 20 others. At the time of the explosion, the DPO was at Bogra Chowk. The head and legs of the bomber were found. Initial reports suggested that the explosion was caused by an improvised explosive device; police sources later said that a suicide bomber blew himself up. Reports also stated that gunfire was heard after the explosion. Assistant Commissioner of Chaman Kashif confirmed the attack. Using a helicopter, the bodies of the injured were brought to hospitals where an emergency had been declared. Law enforcement agencies reached the site and started a search operation.

Perpetrator 
Tehreek-i-Taliban Pakistan claimed responsibility for the attack.

Reactions 
Prime Minister Nawaz Sharif condemned the attack and expressed grief over the loss of lives. Chief Minister of Balochistan Sanaullah Zehri denounced the attack and said that Sajid Mohammad Khan was a brave police officer. Interior Minister Chaudhary Nisar condemned the attack and asked the authorities to present a report of explosion.

References  

2017 murders in Pakistan
Improvised explosive device bombings in Chaman
Islamic terrorist incidents in 2017
July 2017 crimes in Asia
July 2017 events in Pakistan
Motorcycle bombings
Murder in Balochistan, Pakistan
Suicide bombings in 2017
Suicide bombings in Balochistan, Pakistan
Tehrik-i-Taliban Pakistan attacks
Terrorist incidents in Pakistan in 2017
Chaman District